Tiger is an American 2021 two-part sports-biographical documentary miniseries about professional golfer Tiger Woods. It aired in two episodes on HBO on January 10, 2021 and January 17, 2021. The documentary is based on the 2018 book Tiger Woods.

Premise 
The documentary is based on the 2018 biography Tiger Woods and examines Woods' rise, fall, and return in the world of golf. Like the biography, the documentary explores Woods' relationship with his father, and that relationship's effect on the golfer's career. It features interviews with Woods' former caddie Steve Williams, Woods' former girlfriend, Nick Faldo, Bryant Gumbel, and Rachel Uchitel, who was involved in Woods’ infidelity scandal. Tiger notably relies on outside voices to tell Woods' story and does not include his perspective or commentary.

Production 
The filmmakers said that Woods declined to be interviewed for the film twice citing a contractual conflict. Woods' family also doesn't appear in the series. Co-director Matthew Hamachek told Insider that Uchitel agreed to be in the documentary after telling him over lunch that she "felt strongly that nobody had ever told her side of the story; that the media had taken her and turned her into a caricature."

Responses 
Agent Mark Steinberg called the miniseries "another unauthorized and salacious outsider attempt to paint an incomplete portrait of one of the greatest athletes of all-time" after previously denouncing the biography it was based on.

Golfer Collin Morikawa stated that unless Woods "was going to be the one narrating it, I really have no interest" in watching the documentary and that "the best way you can get to know someone is by talking to them."

A source close to Woods said that he was "not thrilled" about the documentary's release and was concerned it would tarnish the image he was working to restore.

Reception
On Rotten Tomatoes, the series holds an approval rating of 73% based on 22 reviews, with an average rating of 6.83/10. The website's critical consensus reads, "Tiger is undeniably well-made - unfortunately it's surface level findings shed little new light on the enigmatic golfer." On Metacritic, the series has a weighted average score of 72 out of 100, based on 16 critics, indicating "generally favorable reviews".

Brian Tallerico gave the film 2 and half stars in a review for RogerEbert.com, saying that film didn't make him feel what it's like to be Tiger Woods. Rolling Stone said the series "lacks the same churning energy of The Last Dance". The Washington Post said the series leaves an "unrevealing portrait of a towering sports figure". The A.V. Club was more positive saying the documentary "still finds a way to present a compelling narrative in its two parts, as directors Matthew Heineman and Matthew Hamachek pull viewers into the life of a man who worked so hard to appear inhumanly perfect, both on and off the golf course."

References 

Cultural depictions of Tiger Woods
2021 American television series debuts
2021 American television series endings
2020s American documentary television series
2020s American television miniseries
HBO documentary films
Documentary television series about sports
Films directed by Matthew Heineman